This is a list of singles which topped the Irish Singles Chart in 1963.

Note that prior to 1992, the Irish singles chart was compiled from trade shipments from the labels to record stores, rather than on consumer sales.

See also
1963 in music
Irish Singles Chart
List of artists who reached number one in Ireland

1963 in Irish music
1963 record charts
1963